Triin Tobi (born June 3, 1995) is an alpine skier from Estonia. She was born in Tartu, and competed for Estonia at the 2014 Winter Olympics in the slalom and giant slalom.

References

External links
 
 

1995 births
Living people
Estonian female alpine skiers
Olympic alpine skiers of Estonia
Alpine skiers at the 2014 Winter Olympics
Sportspeople from Tartu
Alpine skiers at the 2012 Winter Youth Olympics